Bonamico may refer to:

People
 Buonamico Buffalmacco, the Italian Renaissance painter
Ġan Franġisk Bonamico, the doctor and writer  of the Order of St. John
Marco Bonamico, the Italian basketball player

Places
Bonamico (river), the Italian river

Other uses
Bonamico, Italian wine grape from the Tuscany